Known as the “toughest man on the planet” (Goggins, 2021), James Lawrence is a Canadian athlete. He was born in Calgary, Alberta, Canada, and currently lives in Utah. He gained media attention in 2015 for setting the current world record for the most Ironman-distance triathlons completed within a single calendar year: 50. James broke that record in 2021 during the “Conquer 100” in which he completed 100 consecutive Ironman length triathlons in 100 days. He then completed one more for a total of 101 in 101 consecutive days. He also holds the record for the most half-ironman distance triathlons in one year: 22, in 2011.  He is married and has four daughters and one son.

References

Goggins, D. (2021). This Mofo can’t be stopped. Stay Hard Publishing.

Year of birth missing (living people)
Living people
American male triathletes
Canadian male triathletes
Sportspeople from Calgary